Vincent Aubrey Ward  (4 January 1886 – 9 February 1946) was a New Zealand businessman, Member of Parliament and a Member of the Legislative Council.

Biography

Early life
Born in Bluff in 1886 and was educated at the Bluff State Primary School and St. Patrick's College in Wellington. He was the second born son of future Prime Minister Sir Joseph Ward.

He found employment with the National Bank of New Zealand at Wellington before leaving for England in 1907 where he worked first with the merchant firm Messrs.' James Morrison and Son and then at the insurance branch of Lloyds Bank. In 1908 he travelled to New York, spending a period with the U.S. Steel corporation. Ward then left for Montreal in 1911 where he became joint manager of the New Zealand Shipping Company. During World War I he served in the Motor Boat Patrol, gaining his commission in 1915 while Canada. After the war he went to New York for the British Ministry of Shipping before returning to New Zealand in 1920. Upon his arrival in New Zealand he moved to Christchurch and joined his father's firm, Messrs.' J. G. Ward and Co. He married Sybil Mary Petre in 1927. She was the daughter of Henry William Petre and the sister of Francis Petre.

Political career

He first became involved in politics in 1922 he became his father's private secretary prior to the unsuccessful Tauranga by-election, before moving to Wellington after Sir Joseph re-entered Parliament in 1925. He remained as private secretary for the duration of Sir Joseph's second period as Prime Minister.

He replaced his father in the 13 August  for the parliamentary seat of Invercargill that was held after Sir Joseph died. He stood for the United Party, retaining the seat for the government. He retired from Parliament at the next general election in 1931.

He was subsequently appointed to the Legislative Council on 22 June 1934 by Sir Joseph's successor as Prime Minister, George Forbes. At the expiry of his first term, he was reappointed on 23 June 1941 by Peter Fraser. He served until his death on 9 February 1946.

In 1935, he was awarded the King George V Silver Jubilee Medal. In 1938 he unsuccessfully stood for the Wellington City Council on a Citizens' Association ticket.

Later life and death
In later life he was director of several companies and also became secretary of the Wellington Metropolitan Patriotic Council in September 1940. He was appointed a Commander of the Order of the British Empire in the 1946 New Year Honours.

Ward died in Wellington on 9 February 1946, aged 60.

Notes

References

1886 births
1946 deaths
People educated at St. Patrick's College, Wellington
Canadian military personnel of World War I
New Zealand Liberal Party MPs
Members of the New Zealand Legislative Council
New Zealand Liberal Party MLCs
People from Bluff, New Zealand
New Zealand MPs for South Island electorates
Members of the New Zealand House of Representatives
New Zealand Commanders of the Order of the British Empire
Younger sons of baronets
Children of prime ministers of New Zealand